Christian Benson, known professionally as Luude, is an Australian electronic dance music producer. He is best known for his 2021 cover of "Down Under".

He is also half of Australian electronic duo Choomba.

Life and career
Christian Benson was born in Tasmania, Australia the son of a guitar shredder, Mark. After high school, he relocated to Perth, Western Australia after being inspired by an Avicii YouTube clip encouraged him to try producing.

Luude released his first single in December 2015.

On 3 September 2021, Luude released the EP 6AM.

In 2021, Luude remixed Men at Work's "Down Under" as a drum and bass track. Men at Work's lead singer Colin Hay re-recorded the vocal for the track's official release in November 2021, on the Sweat It Out record label. The record made the top ten in Australia and in the United Kingdom and was number one in New Zealand, where by 6 February 2022, it had spent four weeks at number one, twice as many weeks as the original did in 1982.

Discography

EPs

Singles

Awards and nominations

ARIA Music Awards
The ARIA Music Awards is an annual awards ceremony that recognises excellence, innovation, and achievement across all genres of Australian music. They commenced in 1987. 

! 
|-
| rowspan="4"| 2022
| rowspan="3"| "Down Under" (featuring Colin Hay)
| Michael Gudinski Breakthrough Artist
| 
| rowspan="4"| 
|-
| Best Dance/Electronic Release
| 
|-
| Song of the Year
| 
|-
| "Down Under" (featuring Colin Hay) (Luude, Peter Hume)
| Best Video
| 
|-

Notes

References

Australian house musicians
Living people
Year of birth missing (living people)